I Never Made a Record I Didn't Like is Ray Stevens' twenty-fifth studio album and his fifth for MCA Records, released in 1988. Two singles were lifted from the album: "Surfin' U.S.S.R." and "The Day I Tried to Teach Charlene Mackenzie How to Drive." The "Surfin' U.S.S.R." single was accompanied with a music video (his second). The song blends the sound of the Beach Boys with the real world events of the Soviet Union. The second single tells the story of how Stevens attempts to teach a deaf woman how to drive. The character would play an important role several years later when Stevens filmed his direct-to-home video movie, Get Serious!. Connie Freeman portrayed Charlene Mackenzie in the movie.

The album cover shows Stevens as Will Rogers performing a rope trick. Rogers' most often quote is "I never met a man I didn't like" which served as the obvious inspiration for the album's title.

The third track, "Mama's in the Sky With Elvis," was previously featured on the second volume of the Greatest Hits package of Stevens' hits; it makes its first appearance on a studio album.

Track listing

Album credits 
Compiled from liner notes.
 Produced and Arranged by Ray Stevens
 Recorded at Ray Stevens Studio (Nashville, Tennessee).
 Engineer – Stuart Keathley
 Mastered by Glenn Meadows at Masterfonics (Nashville, Tennessee).
 Mastered using the JVC Digital Mastering System.
 Art Direction – Ray Stevens and Slick Lawson
 Design – Barnes & Company
 Photography – Slick Lawson
 Wardrobe and Styling – Susan Lawson
 Stage Manager – Bubba Crigler

Musicians
 Ray Stevens – vocals, synthesizers
 Gary Prim – keyboards
 Mark Casstevens – rhythm guitars, banjo
 Steve Gibson – electric guitars, dobro, mandolin
 Larry Sasser – steel guitar, dobro
 Stuart Keathley – bass
 Tommy Wells – drums
 Terry McMillan – harmonica
 Lisa Silver – fiddle, backing vocals 
 Sheri Huffman – backing vocals 
 Wendy Suits – backing vocals 
 Diane Vanette – backing vocals

Chart performance

Album

Singles

References

1988 albums
MCA Records albums
Ray Stevens albums